Michael "Mike" Coady (born 15 April 1987) is an English former professional rugby union and rugby league footballer who played in the 2000s and 2010s.

Background
Mike Coady was born in Bristol, Avon, England, he was a pupil at Bristol Grammar School, he was a student at Loughborough University, he grew up supporting Halifax rugby league club through his father who was originally from Halifax, he was training to become a teacher in Leicestershire before leaving to join the Leeds Rhinos, as of 2018 he works at Pudsey Grangefield School as a mathematics teacher, during September 2018 he returned to cricket and played for Alwoodley Cricket Club 2nd XI in the Airedale-Wharfedale Senior Cricket League. Michael has kept up his renowned pace in retirement, placing fifth in the 2022 Pudsey Grammer staff race.

Playing career
Mike Coady played for Loughborough Students RUFC in the British Universities and Colleges Sport Cup final at Twickenham Stadium, he made his début for Featherstone Rovers on Sunday 14 February 2010, and he played his last match for Featherstone Rovers during the 2010 season.

References

1987 births
Living people
Doncaster R.L.F.C. players
English rugby league players
English rugby union players
Featherstone Rovers players
Leeds Rhinos players
Rugby league centres
Rugby league players from Bristol
Rugby league wingers
Rugby union players from Bristol